No Promises is the second album by the Italian-French singer Carla Bruni. It was recorded during 2006 and released in January 2007.  While Bruni's début album, Quelqu'un m'a dit, was sung in French;  this album was sung in English.

All tracks on the album are adapted by Bruni from poems by 19th- and 20th-century authors.

Review 

 Allmusic said:
"After the runaway success of her charming, folksy first album Quelqu'un M'a Dit, Carla Bruni's sophomore effort takes a more difficult route and sees her setting canonical works by such poets as Yeats and Emily Dickinson to music, often calamitously. W.H. Auden's "At Last the Secret Is Out" offers a case in point. Set to a brisk Jack Johnson-style swinging guitar, the poem becomes stripped of all its meaning: no one word is allowed to stand out, as each line is madly shoehorned into a sensible rhythm, and the wistful, yearning tone of the poem gets lost in the breezy melody of the song. Therein lies the problem. Bruni's blues guitar template is too rigid to allow these words to breathe. The lines "Wrapping that foul body up/In as foul a rag" in Yeats' "Those Dancing Days Are Gone" are delivered almost winsomely, where in fact the word "foul" should be allowed to drag, and to weigh down the rest of the line. Metered verse cannot fit this sort of verse-verse-chorus model. Of course, an album must be judged on its musical merits, and the overall mixture of rhythm and pedal steel guitars, with a touch of harmonica here and there, is a serviceable foil to Bruni's smoky voice. But even here, one would wish for more clarity in the line readings: the breathlessness of her singing means that sentences often fizzle out. Dorothy Parker's stark "Afternoon" is maltreated in this way, as is Emily Dickinson's wonderful poem "I Felt My Life with Both My Hands"—and the absurd jauntiness of both songs is almost unbearable. The one highlight of the set is the doo wop piano-and-guitar jam on Dickinson's "If You Were Coming in the Fall," which lends itself oddly well to Bruni's sauce. But this is an impersonal set of disparate poems set often unimaginatively to incongruous arrangements. It is a brave failure, but a failure nonetheless."

Track listing

Charts

Weekly charts

Year-end charts

Certifications and sales

References 

2007 albums
Carla Bruni albums
Music based on poems
Musical settings of poems by Christina Rossetti